St. Dunstan's School may refer to:

South Africa
 St. Dunstan's College (South Africa)

United Kingdom
 St Dunstan's Community School, Glastonbury, Somerset
 St Dunstan's College, Catford, London

United States
 St. Dunstan's Episcopal High School, Saint Croix, US Virgin Islands